The Road to Little Dribbling: More Notes From a Small Island is a humorous travel book by American author Bill Bryson, first published in 2015.

Twenty years after the publication of Notes From a Small Island, Bryson makes another journey around Great Britain to see what has changed. In the opening chapters he notes that the straight line distance from Bognor Regis on the south coast to Cape Wrath in Scotland is the longest straight line one can travel in the UK without crossing any part of the sea. He dubs this the "Bryson Line" and uses it as a rough basis for the route he travels in the book, concentrating mainly on places that he did not visit in Notes from a Small Island.

The U.K. cover depicts The Jolly Fisherman of Skegness, skipping with the Seven Sisters in the background. Both of these are iconic images of British sea-side culture and landscape, although geographically distant from one another.

The book has received mixed reviews.

References

Books by Bill Bryson
Books about the United Kingdom
2015 non-fiction books
Doubleday (publisher) books
American travel books